Miss Universe Malaysia 2012, the 46th edition of the Miss Universe Malaysia, was held on 10 November 2012 at Sunway Pyramid Convention Centre, Subang Jaya, Selangor. Kimberley Leggett of Penang was crowned by the outgoing titleholder, Deborah Priya Henry of Kuala Lumpur at the end of the event. She then represented Malaysia at the Miss Universe 2006 pageant in Las Vegas, United States.

Results

Judges 

 Amir Luqman – Malaysian fashion designer
 Stephanie Kay – fashion designer
 Gillian Hung – fashion guru
 Andrew Tan – fashion icon
 Datin Josephine Fonseka – Miss Malaysia Universe 1970
 Bill Keith – fashion designer

Contestants 
  From Top 30 Finalists down to Top 19 Grand Finalists. 

1 Age during the contest

Crossovers 
Contestants who previously competed/appeared at other national beauty pageants:

Miss Universe Malaysia
 2015 - Sugeeta Chandran (3rd Runner-up)

Miss Earth
 2012 - Deviyah Daranee Radhakrishnan (Unplaced/Best Talent Group 3/2nd Runner-up Best National Costume)

Miss Earth Malaysia
 2012 - Deviyah Daranee Radhakrishnan (Winner)

Miss Tourism International 
 2012 - Aileen Gabriella Robinson (Winner)

Miss Tourism Malaysia 
 2011 - Aileen Gabriella Robinson (Winner)

Miss Global International Malaysia
 2011 - Genevie Wan Anyie (Finalists Top 16)

Miss Borneo Beautiful
 2010 - Genevie Wan Anyie (1st Runner-up)

Seventeen Cover Girl 
 2008 - Juanita David Ramayah (Winner)

References

2012 beauty pageants
2012 in Malaysia
2012